Haji Rufai Bey Mosque is a mosque in Nakhichevan,  Azerbaijan. It was built in the 18th century.

Buildings and structures in the Nakhchivan Autonomous Republic
Mosques in Azerbaijan
Safavid architecture